This is a list of instant noodle brands. Instant noodles are a dried or precooked noodle block, usually sold with a packet of flavoring powder and/or seasoning oil. Dried noodles are usually eaten after being cooked or soaked in boiling water, while precooked noodles can be reheated or eaten straight from the packet/cup. The instant noodle was invented by Momofuku Ando of Nissin Foods in Japan. They were launched in 1958 under the brand name Chikin Ramen.

Instant noodle brands

By country 

Instant noodles are a popular food in many parts of the world, undergoing changes in flavor to fit local tastes. In 2018, the World Instant Noodles Association (WINA) reported that 103,620 million servings were consumed worldwide. China (and Hong Kong) consumed 40,250 million servings and Indonesia consumed 12,540 million, the three areas dominating world instant noodle consumption. South Korea tops the world in per capita consumption at 75 servings per year. It is followed by Vietnam at 54 servings, and Nepal at 53.

Australia
The most popular manufacturer of instant noodles in Australia is San Remo Macaroni Company, whose Fantastic and Suimin brands hold a 30% market share. Other brands include Indomie, Indomie Mi Goreng, Maggi, Mr Lee's Noodles, Wai Wai, Nissin's Demae Ramen, and Nongshim's Shin ramyun. Instant noodles are often referred to as "two-minute noodles" in Australia, a reflection of their preparation time.

China

According to industry trade group World Instant Noodles Association, China is the world's largest instant noodle market, with demand reaching 40.25 million servings in 2018.

Colombia
Instant noodles were introduced to Colombia in 2010 by Nissin Foods. On 13 September 2013, Nissin Foods opened its commercial office in Bogotá, investing US$ 6 million in its corporate offices.

Hong Kong
Cantonese people have a long history of cooking yi mein, a noodle invented in the Qing Dynasty. However, modern instant noodles were only publicly introduced to Hong Kong in the late 1960s by Winner Food Products Ltd. as "Doll Noodles". Although the company was bought out by Nissin in 1984, and other brands from many different countries have become widely available, the name "Doll Noodles" remains ubiquitous and has since become a synonym for instant noodles, irrespective of brands.

Most supermarkets offer a broad selection of both domestic and international brands, including Shin Ramyun of South Korea, Nissin Chikin and Demae Itcho of Japan, Indomie of Indonesia, Koka of Singapore, and Mama of Thailand. Besides instant wheat noodles, supermarkets also sell instant rice noodles and Cantonese egg noodles.

Some noodles are also marketed as a snack that does not need to be cooked; consumers eat the noodles directly out of the packaging, similar to crisps.

Hungary
Hungary is 43rd in the world in consumption of instant noodles, according to the World Instant Noodles Association (WINA), having consumed 20 million packages/cups of noodles in 2014.

Thai President Foods, manufacturer of MAMA noodles, opened an instant noodles factory in Hungary in 2013. The Hungarian factory's two production lines have a capacity of 4.5 million noodle packs per shift per month. It produces "Thai Chef" and "Asia Gold" brand noodles for the European market.

India
According to WINA, in 2018, India was the third largest consumer of instant noodles after China/Hong Kong and Indonesia.

On 5 June 2015, the Food Safety and Standards Authority of India (FSSAI) banned all nine approved variants of Maggi instant noodles from India, terming them "unsafe and hazardous" for human consumption.

As per FSSAI, Nestle had launched the products without completing the process of risk assessment, and Nestle committed three violations:

Despite a six-month ban on Maggi in 2015 for high monosodium glutamate (MSG) and lead content, Nestle India regained strength and rallied 149 percent from lows of Rs 5,011 per share hit in March 2016.

India is Nestle Maggi's largest market. Other brands of instant noodles in the country include Patanjali Ayurved, Ching's Secret, Knorr, Sunfeast Yippee, Top Ramen, Indomie, Joymee, Nissin, Maruchan, Horlicks, Wai Wai, and several domestic and regional names. Many brands from East and Southeast Asia, such as Koka, Picnic, Nongshim, Samyang, Jin Ramen, and Yum Yum also started flooding the Indian market after various free-trade agreements.

Indonesia

According to WINA, Indonesia is the world's second largest instant noodle market after China, with demand reaching 12.54 billion servings in 2018.

An early instant noodle brand in Indonesia was "Supermi", introduced in 1968 by PT Lima Satu Sankyo (later renamed PT Super Mi Indonesia in 1977 and PT Lambang Insan Makmur in 1989). After success of Supermi, another instant noodle brands were appeared: "Indomie", introduced in 1972 by PT Sanmaru Food Manufacturing Co. Ltd., and "Sarimi", introduced in 1982 by PT Sarimi Asli Jaya. In 1994, these brands (as well as factories) were merged into Indofood Sukses Makmur, one of the largest instant noodle producer in the world.

At least twenty instant noodle companies compete in the Indonesian market, with Indofood, Wings, Olaga, OT (ABC), Wicaksana (Gaga), Mayora, Lemonilo, Tiptop, and Arirang thriving in the top nine. In 1999, the figure was about 90%; their market share declined following the introduction of "Mie Sedaap" by Wings Food in 2003. Strong local preferences contribute to the low volume of sales of Japanese and other foreign instant noodles in Indonesia.

Popular instant noodle flavours in Indonesia include chicken curry, onion and chicken, bakso (beef meatball), mie goreng, and chicken soto, a traditional Indonesian chicken soup. In the past, Indomie tried to produce thirty different flavours to reflect various traditional dishes of Indonesian cuisine, but the product line was discontinued after disappointing results, with only a few variants remaining in production. Indonesians usually add ingredients such as boiled Chinese green cabbage, boiled or fried eggs, corned beef, bottled sambal chili sauce, pepper, or fried shallots to their meals.

Most of the market share is owned by the product Indomie Mi goreng, a dry instant noodle meant to replicate traditional Indonesian mie goreng, or fried noodles. In November 2019, LA Times named Indomie Barbecue Chicken flavour and Indomie Mi Goreng as among the best-tasting ramen in the world.

Although originally targeted at families eating at home, nowadays instant noodles are also served in warung (simple shops). These shops serving instant noodles are customarily called warung indomie or warmindo, despite the fact that the brands of instant noodles served there are not necessarily Indomie.

Japan
Japan is the country of origin of instant noodles, and the dish remains a "national" light food. The average Japanese person eats forty packs of instant noodles per year.

After their invention by Momofuku Andō in 1958, instant noodles became very common in Japan. In the 1970s, makers expanded their flavors to include such examples as shio (salt), miso, or curry. Beginning in the 1980s, manufacturers also added dried toppings such as shrimp, pork, or eggs. Today, instant noodles are divided into two groups: "traditional" cheap (¥70 to ¥200) noodles with few toppings and expensive (¥150 to ¥350) noodles with many toppings, which are often packed into a pouch. Various kinds of instant noodles are produced, including ramen, udon, soba, yakisoba, and pasta.

Major instant noodle brands in Japan include:
 Nissin Foods 日清食品, whose products include "Chicken Ramen" and "Cup Noodles". The brand has a 40.4% market share .
 Tōyō Suisan 東洋水産, under the brand name Maruchan, whose products include "Akai Kitsune" and "Midori no Tanuki"; 19.2% market share.
  サンヨー食品; "Sapporo Ichiban"; 11.5% market share.
 Myōjō Foods 明星食品, Charumera, has a 9.9% market share.
  エースコック; "Super Cup"; 8.3% market share.

South Korea
Ramyeon, is the Korean equivalent of instant noodles. The first ramyeon brand in South Korea was Samyang, made in 1963.

Ramyeon is typically spicy and salty. Shin Ramyun (신[辛], literally "spicy") is the bestselling brand in South Korea. It has also become popular in China and the United States. The leading manufacturer of ramyeon in South Korea is Nong Shim ([農心], literally "Farmer's Heart"), which exports many of its products overseas. South Korea is the highest instant noodle-consuming country per person.

North Korea
In 2004, over 600,000 boxes of Shin Ramyun were sent to North Korea as part of the aid relief program when the Ryongchŏn train station exploded, injuring many people. Insider sources have said that most of the noodles were sold on black markets, making their way to Pyongyang instead of being distributed as aid. North Korean visitors to China also frequently purchase South Korean ramyeon, where Shin Ramyeon is known as "Korean Tangmi Ramyeon."

Local production of ramyeon in North Korea began in 2000. The first brand was "Kkoburang guksu", which literally means "curly noodles" in. Later, a joint venture between North Korean and Hong Kong-based companies began producing "Jŭksŏk guksu", which literally means "instant noodles". Ramyeon is popular among North Korean elites who live in Pyongyang and Nampo. In contrast to hot and spicy South Korean noodles, North Korean varieties have a much milder and brothier flavor.

Nepal
Per capita consumption of instant noodles in Nepal is the third highest in the world, at 53 servings. In the early 1980s, Gandaki Noodles of Pokhara city introduced Rara, an instant noodle brand named after the largest lake in Nepal. It was a success among urban populations. Around 1985, Chaudhary Groups entered the market with Wai-Wai, a Thai brand of instant noodles, which became a big hit. Over the years, the popularity of instant noodles has grown and consist of a major part of the dry foods sold in Nepal.

Nigeria
Since its introduction in 1988, Indomie is the most popular instant noodle brand in Nigeria. Instant noodles are now eaten in most households across the country. By 2008, nine other brands of noodles had appeared in Nigeria. Affirming Indomie's hold on the market, Christopher Ezendu, a distributor at the popular Oke-Arin market on Lagos Island, reported that these other brands are aspiring to be like the market leader. In 2013, a wholly-owned and managed Nigerian company based in Abuja, Royal Mills and Foods limited, launched a new brand of instant noodles, De-Royal Instant Noodles, with two flavors, chicken and onion chicken.

According to the World Instant Noodle Association, Nigeria was the eleventh largest consumer of instant noodles in the world in 2019.

Pakistan
Instant noodles are not a traditional part of Pakistani cuisine but have become popular in flavors such as masala and chicken. There are three prominent brands of instant noodles in Pakistan: Nestlé's Maggi was the first to enter the market in 1992, followed by Knorr of Unilever in 1993; in 2012, Shan Food Industries introduced "Shoop". Knorr is the leader, with 55% market share; Maggi's market share is 45%.

Poland
Instant noodles began appearing on Polish store shelves during the early 1990s. Despite being called "Chinese soup", the first brands on the market were produced in Vietnam and had a somewhat spicy, garlic-flavored taste. The noodle packages contained pouches of flavored soup base, spicy oil, dried vegetables, or even minuscule shrimps.

The product gained particular popularity among students due to its affordability and convenience. "Kaczka łagodna" ("Mild duck"), "Kurczakowa łagodna" ("Mild chicken"), and "Krewetkowa ostra" ("Spicy shrimp") were the most common flavors. Today, the local Kim Lan and international Knorr brands offer varieties ranging from cheese-and-herb-flavored noodles to local Polish specialties like barszcz czerwony or żurek.

Ngoc Tu Tao, who emigrated to Poland from Vietnam and established the Tan-Viet Group in 1990, is credited with introducing instant noodles to Poland. His Vifon brand holds a 35% share of the Polish instant soup market, selling over 100 million packages a year. Ngoc Tu Tao has appeared in Wprost magazine's annual ranking of the 100 most wealthy Polish citizens.

Russia
Russia's most popular instant ramen are from local brand Rollton and the Korean Doshirak. Instant noodles have been popular in Russia's eastern regions since the late 1980s and made their way west in the early 1990s. In Russia, like most noodle products, they are still considered a lesser-quality option to turn to in lean economic times and are popular among college students.

Sri Lanka
A variety of instant noodles are available in Sri Lanka and appeal to local tastes. Examples include rice noodles or kurakkan noodles, as well as curry-flavoured and kottu-flavoured noodles.

Over 8,000 tonnes of instant noodles are consumed in Sri Lanka each year. Maggi, Sera, Harischandra are some the biggest brands in Sri Lanka.

Taiwan
Instant noodle inventor Momofuku Ando was born in Japanese Taiwan. According to statistics from the International Ramen Manufacturers Association, Taiwan is the world's twelfth-largest instant noodle market, with an annual NT$10 billion (US$300 million) in sales. This translates into an annual total of 900 million packs, or forty per person. Uni-President (aka President or Tong-Yi, 統一) takes the largest market share of instant noodles in the country, and is a major player in the global instant noodle market.

Major makers Taiwanese instant noodle manufacturers include:
 Uni-President is the first instant noodle maker in Taiwan.  In 1970, the company launched their original product. Uni-President has the greatest market share in Taiwan and is also one of the largest instant noodle makers in mainland China.
 VEDAN (味丹; Pinyin: Wei Dan) is a Taiwanese food company headquartered in Shalu District, Taichung City. Vedan started its business mainly by producing sodium glutamate (MSG). It is currently one of the top ten MSG manufacturers in the world. In addition, the company has successively invested in instant noodles, beverages, and many other food products since 1973.
 Wei Lih (維力) is a well-known food company in Taiwan founded in 1970. It is headquartered in Changhua County. Its main product is instant noodles, and it also produces snacks, beverages, seasonings, and biotech products. Wei Lih is famous for its Zhajiangmian (炸醬麵) and Good Good Eat Noodles (張君雅小妹妹).

Thailand

Thailand's instant noodle market in 2019 was estimated to be worth 17 billion baht. The market leader is the MAMA brand, produced by Thai President Foods. MAMA got its start in 1972 as a joint venture between Taiwan's President Enterprise and Thailand's Saha Pathanapibul PLC. The brand controls about half the Thai instant noodle market, and "Mama" has become a generic name for instant noodles in Thailand. Thai people consume an average of 45 packs of noodles per person per year, fourth in the world after Indonesia, Vietnam, and Malaysia.

In second place is the Wai Wai brand from Thai Preserved Food Factory at 23–24 percent, followed by Ajinomoto's Yum Yum brand at 20–21 percent.

Due to their ubiquity, instant noodles were chosen as a vehicle for dietary fortification by a joint effort of the Federation of Thai Industries, instant noodle producers, and the Ministry of Public Health about ten years ago. The vitamins and minerals added are iron, iodine, and vitamin A.

Ukraine
The first time instant noodles appeared in the Ukrainian market in the 1990s, and quickly became iconic food. The first Ukrainian brand of instant noodles was Mivina created in 1995 by Technocom - the company founded in 1993 by Vietnamese entrepreneur Phạm Nhật Vượng. The name of the brand comes from vietnamese "mì Việt Nam", which translates as "Vietnamese noodles". Due to popularity of the brand,  the name "Mivina" became a household name for instant noodles among Ukrainian consumers.

From the start, instant noodles was often eaten in raw as a snack in Ukraine. It was especially popular among schoolchildren. Knowing that, Mivina created the child-oriented sweet instant noodles with cinnamon and vanilla flavour. Later it was replaced with orange, pineapple, coconut, banana and strawberry flavours. Despite its popularity, the sweet Mivina was discontinued, but was returned for short period in 2017 under the name Mivina Fruktel, with banana and strawberry flavours only.

Instant noodles are also often used as an ingredient in various recipes.

In 2010, Technocom and Mivina was sold to Nestlé. The diversity of products decreased with time. In the late 2010s the brand became focused on more expensive products.

Other brands available in Ukrainian market are Rollton and Big Bon produced by Mareven Food Europe LLC, Golden Dragon, Tanuki, Rooltick and Ukrainian Star produced by LLC Kuhovar. Most supermarket chains have their own instant noodles brands.

United Kingdom

A common form of instant noodles in Britain is Pot Noodle, a cup noodle first marketed by Golden Wonder in the late 1970s and acquired by Unilever in 1995.

Packet noodles such as Batchelors' Super Noodles are also sold. Bigger supermarkets also sell foreign brands, such as Nissin, Koka noodles, and Shin Ramyun, which once could only be found in Asian groceries. Larger retail chains may offer their own brand in basic packaging and a variety of flavours, e.g., Asda, Maggi. Kabuto Noodles, launched in 2010, was the UK's first up-market instant noodle brand, followed by Itsu and Mr Lee's Noodles.

United States
In the United States, instant noodles were first made available by Nissin Foods in 1971. In 1972, the company introduced "Nissin Cup Noodles" in a foam food cup, which led to an upsurge in popularity. Soon after, many other competing companies were offering similar instant noodle products.

Today in the U.S., instant noodles are commonly known as "ramen", after the Japanese dish on which they were originally based, and they come in a variety of flavors such as beef, chicken, and shrimp. Ramen has become synonymous in America for all instant noodle products. Some prominent brands are Top Ramen (originally Top Ramen's Oodles of Noodles), Maruchan, and Sapporo Ichiban. A wide range of popular brands imported from other countries are available at many Asian grocery stores and some supermarkets. Instant ramen noodles are popular among students and people of low income, due to their ease of preparation, versatility, and low cost.

According to research by Michael Gibson-Light, a doctoral candidate at the University of Arizona School of Sociology, in the US prison system, by 2016 ramen packets had become a form of commodity currency, comprising a mainstay of the informal economy there and supplanting cigarettes.

Vietnam

Instant noodles are popular in Vietnam, where they are often eaten as a breakfast food. Per capita consumption in 2018 was 54 servings per year. Both wheat and rice noodles are common. Acecook Vietnam, Masan Food, and AsiaFoods are leading producers of instant noodles.

Gallery

See also

 List of brand name food products
 List of instant foods
 List of noodles
 List of noodle dishes
 List of pasta

References

External links
 

 
Instant noodle brands
Ramen